Australia competed at the 1996 Summer Olympics in Atlanta, United States. Australia sent 417 athletes, 250 men and 167 women, to the Atlanta Games.

An Australian segment was featured in the closing ceremony, as Australia was to host the next edition of the Summer Olympics in Sydney four years later.

Medalists

Gold
Wendy Schaeffer, Phillip Dutton, Andrew Hoy, and Gillian Rolton — equestrian, three-day event team competition
 Michelle Andrews, Alyson Annan, Louise Dobson, Renita Farrell, Juliet Haslam, Rechelle Hawkes, Clover Maitland, Karen Marsden, Jenn Morris, Nova Peris-Kneebone, Jackie Pereira, Katrina Powell, Lisa Powell, Danni Roche, Kate Starre, and Liane Tooth — field hockey, women's tournament
James Tomkins, Drew Ginn, Nicholas Green, and Mike McKay — rowing, men's coxless fours
Kate Slatter and Megan Still — rowing, women's coxless pairs
Michael Diamond — shooting, men's trap shooting
Russell Mark — shooting, men's double trap
Kieren Perkins — swimming, men's 1500m freestyle
Susie O'Neill — swimming, women's 200m butterfly
Todd Woodbridge and Mark Woodforde — tennis, men's doubles

Silver
 Cathy Freeman — athletics, women's 400 metres 
 Louise McPaul — athletics, women's javelin throw
 Michelle Ferris — cycling, women's sprint
 Rob Scott and David Weightman — rowing, men's coxless pairs
 Daniel Kowalski — swimming, men's 1500m freestyle
 Scott Miller — swimming, men's 100m butterfly
Petria Thomas — swimming, women's 200m butterfly
Nicole Stevenson, Susie O'Neill, Samantha Riley, Sarah Ryan, Helen Denman (heats), and Angela Kennedy (heats) — wwimming, women's 4 × 100 m medley relay
Mitch Booth and Andrew Landenberger — sailing, men's Tornado

Bronze
 Michele Timms, Allison Tranquilli, Jenny Whittle, Fiona Robinson, Shelley Sandie, Rachael Sporn, Michelle Chandler, Trisha Fallon, Robyn Maher, Carla Boyd, Michelle Brogan, and Sandy Brondello — basketball, women's tournament
 Clint Robinson — canoeing, men's K1 1000m kayak singles
 Danny Collins and Andrew Trim — canoeing, men's 500m kayak pairs
 Katrin Borchert and Anna Wood — canoeing, women's K2 500m kayak pairs
 Bradley McGee — cycling, men's 4000m individual pursuit
 Bradley McGee, Stuart O'Grady, Tim O'Shannessey, and Dean Woods — cycling, men's 4000m team pursuit
 Stuart O'Grady — cycling, men's points race
 Lucy Tyler-Sharman — cycling, women's points race
 Stuart Carruthers, Baeden Choppy, Stephen Davies, Damon Diletti, Lachlan Dreher, Lachlan Elmer, Brendan Garard, Paul Gaudoin, Mark Hager, Paul Lewis, Grant Smith, Matthew Smith, Daniel Sproule, Jay Stacy, Michael York and Ken Wark — field hockey, men's tournament
Ronald Snook, Duncan Free, Bo Hanson, and Janusz Hooker — rowing, men's quadruple sculls
Anthony Edwards and Bruce Hick — rowing, men's lwt double scull
Rebecca Joyce and Virginia Lee — rowing, women's lwt double scull
Deserie Huddleston — shooting, women's double trap
Natalie Ward, Brooke Wilkins, Nicole Richardson, Melanie Roche, Natalie Titcume, Malina Milson, Tracey Mosley, Haylea Petrie, Joyce Lester, Sally McDermid, Francine McRae, Suzanne Fairhurst, Tanya Harding, Jennifer Holliday, Carolyn Crudgington, Kerry Dienelt, Peta Edebone, Belinda Ashworth, Joanne Brown, and Kim Cooper — softball, women's tournament
Daniel Kowalski — swimming, men's 200m freestyle
Daniel Kowalski — swimming, men's 400m freestyle
Scott Goodman — swimming, men's 200m butterfly
Phil Rogers, Steven Dewick, Scott Miller, Michael Klim, and Toby Haenen (heats) — swimming, men's 4 × 100 m medley relay
Samantha Riley — swimming, women's 100m breaststroke
Emma Johnson, Susie O'Neill, Julia Greville, Nicole Stevenson, and Lise Mackie (heats) — wwimming, women's 4 × 200 m freestyle relay
Natalie Cook and Kerri Ann Pottharst — volleyball, women's beach volleyball 
Stefan Botev — weightlifting, men's super heavyweight (> 108 kg)
Colin Beashel and David Giles — Sailing, men's Star

Archery

In the seventh Olympic archery competition that Australia contested, the nation sent three men and three women. Matthew Gray had the nation's only individual win, though the men's team won twice in the team round before being defeated in the semifinal and the bronze medal match.

Women's individual competition:
 Myfanwy Matthews → Round of 64, 48th place (0-1)
 Deonne Bridger → Round of 64, 57th place (0-1)

Men's individual competition:
 Matthew Gray → Round of 32, 26th place (1-1)
 Jackson Fear → Round of 64, 35th place (0-1)
 Simon Fairweather → Round of 64, 52nd place (0-1)

Men's team competition:
 Gray, Fear, and Fairweather → Bronze medal match, 4th place (2-2)

Athletics

Men's 100 metres
 Rod Mapstone 
 Qualification — 10.56 (6th) (→ did not advance)
Paul Henderson
 Qualification — 10.52 (5th) (→ did not advance)

Men's 200 metres
Steve Brimacombe
 Qualification — 20.53 (3rd)
 Semi-finals — 20.38 (5th) (→ did not advance)
Dean Capobianco 	
 Qualification — 21.03 (7th) (→ did not advance)

Men's 400 metres
Paul Greene
 Qualification — 46.12 (3rd)
 Quarter-finals — 46.22 (8th) (→ did not advance)
Mark Ladbrook
 Qualification — 46.28 (5th) (→ did not advance)
Michael Joubert
 Qualification — 46.30 (5th) (→ did not advance)

Men's 800 metres
 Paul Byrne
 Qualification — 1:47.05 (3rd)
 Semi-Finals — 1:47.58 (6th) (→ did not advance)

Men's 1,500 metres
 Paul Cleary
 Qualification — 3:52.85 (→ did not advance)

Men's 5,000 metres
 Shaun Creighton
 Qualification — 14:04.08
 Semifinal — 13:55.23 (→ did not advance)
 Julian Paynter
 Qualification — 14:00.25
 Semifinal — 14:23.60 (→ did not advance)

Men's 10,000 metres
 Shaun Creighton
 Qualification — 28:44.29 (13th) (→ did not advance)

Men's 4 × 100 m relay
Paul Henderson, Tim Jackson, Steve Brimacombe, and Rod Mapstone
 Heat — 38.93 (1st)
 Semi Final — 39.10DQ (→ did not advance)

Men's 4 × 400 m relay
Mark Ladbrook, Michael Joubert, Paul Greene, and Cameron Mackenzie
 Heat — 3:03.73
 Semi Final — 3:04.55 (→ did not advance)

Men's 110m hurdles
Kyle Vander Kuyp
 Heat — 13.32 (1st)
 Quarter-final — 13.49 (3rd)
 Semi-final — 13.38 (4th)
 Final — 13.40 (7th)

Men's 400m hurdles
Rohan Robinson
Heat — 48.89s
Semi final — 48.28s
Final — 48.30s (→ 5th place)
Simon Hollingsworth
Heat — 52.16 (→ did not advance)

Men's 3,000 metres steeplechase
Chris Unthank
 Heat — 8:31.86 
 Semifinals — 8:25.59 (→ did not advance)

Men's decathlon
Peter Winter
Did not finish (10.85 (-0.4), NM, 13.43m)
DNF Decathlon after 3 no jumps in long jump
Scott Ferrier
Did not finish

Men's marathon
 Steve Moneghetti — 2:14.35 (→ 7th place)
 Rod de Highden — 2:17.42 (→ 23rd place)
 Sean Quilty — 2:19.35 (→ 34th place)

Men's 20 km walk
 Nicholas A'Hern 	1:20:31 (4th place) 	
 Dion Russell 	1:30:04	(47th place) 	

Men's 50 km walk
Duane Cousins — did not finish (→ no ranking)
Simon Baker — DSQ (→ no ranking)

Men's hammer throw
 Sean Carlin
 Qualification — 72.32m (→ did not advance)

Men's high jump
 Tim Forsyth
 Qualification — 2.28m (1st)
 Final — 2.32m (7th)
Chris Anderson 
 Qualification — 2.15 (27th → did not advance)

Men's triple jump
 Andrew Murphy 
 Qualification — 16.0m (34th → did not advance)

Men's pole vault
 Simon Arkell
 Qualification — no mark (→ did not advance)
 James Miller
 Qualification — 5.60m (→ did not advance)

Men's javelin throw
 Andrew Currey
 Qualification — 77.28m (→ did not advance)

Women's 10,000 metres
 Susan Hobson
 Qualification — 32:25.13
 Final — 32:47.71 (→ 17th place)
 Kylie Risk
 Qualification — did not finish (→ did not advance)

Women's 4 × 400 metres relay
 Lee Naylor, Kylie Hanigan, Melinda Gainsford-Taylor, and Renee Poetschka
 Qualification — 3:33.78 (→ did not advance)

Women's long jump
 Nicole Boegman
 Qualification — 6.67m
 Final — 6.73m (→ 8th place)

Women's discus throw
 Lisa-Marie Vizaniari
 Qualification — 63.00m
 Final — 62.48m (→ 8th place)
 Daniela Costian
 Qualification — 61.66m (→ did not advance)

Women's javelin throw
 Louise McPaul
 Qualification — 62.32m
 Final — 65.54m (→  Silver medal)
 Joanna Stone
 Qualification — 58.54m (→ did not advance)

Women's heptathlon
 Jane Jamieson
 Final Result — 5897 points (→ 20th place)

Women's marathon
 Kerryn McCann — 2:36.41 (→ 28th place)
 Suzanne Malaxos — 2:50.46 (→ 57th place)
 Lisa Ondieki — did not finish (→ no ranking)

Women's 10 km walk
 Kerry Saxby-Junna — 43:59 (→ 12th place)
 Anne Manning — 45:27 (→ 19th place)
 Jane Saville — 45:56 (→ 26th place)

Badminton

Men's singles
 Murray Hocking
 1st round: vs Iain Sydie (CAN) - 9-15, 9-15 - did not advance

Men's doubles
 Peter Blackburn and Paul Staight
 1st round: vs Stephan Beeharry and Eddy Clarisse (MRI) - 15-3, 15-7
 2nd round: vs Huang Zhanzhong and Jiang Xin (CHN) - 7-15, 9-15 - did not advance

Women's singles
 Lisa Campbell
 1st round: vs Yasuko Mizui (JPN) - 0-11, 11-8, 7-11 - did not advance
 Song Yang
 1st round: vs Kelly Morgan (GBR) - 1-11, 5-11 - did not advance

Women's doubles
 Rhonda Cator and Amanda Hardy
 1st round: vs Lili Tampi and Finarsih (INA) - 9-15, 4-15 - did not advance

Mixed doubles
 Murray Hocking and Lisa Campbell
 1st round: vs Tao Xiaoqiang and Wang Xiaoyuan (CHN) - 5-15, 4-15 - did not advance
 Peter Blackburn and Rhonda Cator
 1st round: vs Mikhail Korshuk and Vlada Chernyavskaya (BLR) - 18-14, 15-9
 2nd round: vs Liu Jianjun and Sun Man (CHN) - 4-15, 15-7, 4-15 - did not advance
 Paul Stevenson and Amanda Hardy
 1st round: vs Darryl Yung and Denyse Julien (CAN) - 9-15, 3-15 - did not advance

Baseball

Men's tournament
Australia made its first appearance in the official Olympic baseball tournament in 1996. The team won two of its preliminary round games, against Korea and Japan, but lost the other five. The Australians' record put them in a three-way tie for fifth, with all three teams eliminated from contention and the tie-breaker rules used only to formally place the three teams. Australia came out on the bottom of that tie-breaker, and ended up in seventh place.

Team roster
Jeff Williams
Mark Doubleday
Scott Tunkin
Michael Nakamura
Steven Hinton
Richard Vagg
Andrew Scott
Shane Tonkin
Jason Hewitt
Andrew McNally
Matthew Sheldon-Collins
Peter Vogler
David Hynes
Grant McDonald
Scott Dawes
Stuart Howell
Sten Lindberg
Simon Sheldon-Collins
Stuart Thompson
John Moore

Basketball

Men's tournament

Preliminary round

Quarterfinals

Semifinals

Bronze medal match

Women's tournament

Team roster
Carla Boyd
Michelle Brogan
Sandy Brondello
Michelle Chandler
Trisha Fallon
Robyn Maher
Fiona Robinson
Shelley Sandie
Rachael Sporn
Michele Timms
Allison Tranquilli
Jenny Whittle
Head coach: Tom Maher
Preliminary round

Quarterfinals

Semifinals

Bronze medal match

Beach volleyball

 Julien Prosser and Lee Zahner — 9th place overall

Boxing

Men's flyweight (51 kg)
Hussein Hussein
 First round — defeated Carmine Molaro (Italy), 11-8
 Second round — lost to Damaen Kelly (Ireland), 20-27

Men's bantamweight (54 kg)
James Swan
 First round — lost to Kalai Riadh (Tunisia), 4-14

Men's featherweight (57 kg)
Robert Peden
 First round — defeated Mohamed Achik (Morocco), 15-7
 Second round — lost to Serafim Todorov (Bulgaria), 8-20

Men's light welterweight (63,5 kg)
Lee Trautsch
 First round — lost to Fethi Missaoui (Tunisia), 9-25

Men's light welterweight (67 kg)
Lynden Hosking
 First round — lost to Nurzhan Smanov (Kazakhstan), referee stopped contest in second round

Men's light middleweight (71 kg)
Richard Rowles
 First round — lost to György Mizsei (Hungary), 2-10

Men's middleweight (75 kg)
Justann Crawford
 First round — defeated Sackey Shivute (Namibia), 12-3
 Second round — lost to Alexander Lebziak (Russia), referee stopped contest in third round

Men's light heavyweight (81 kg)
Rick Timperi
 First round — lost to Thomas Ulrich (Germany), 7-21

Canoeing

Slalom

Men's C-1
 Justin Boocock
 Total score: 166.96 - 16th

Men's C-2
 Andrew Wilson and John Felton
 Total score: 199.06 - 14th

Men's K-1
 Richard MacQuire
 Total score: 153.07 - 24th
 Matthew Pallister
 Total score: 179.19 - 38th

Women's K-1
 Mia Farrance
 Total score: 180.30 - 14th
 Danielle Woodward
 Total score: 177.60 - 12th

Sprint

Men's K-1 500 metres
 Cameron McFadzean
 Qualifying heat: 1:42.160 - 2nd
 Semi final: 1:41.083 - 4th
 Final: 1:41.023 - 9th

Men's K-1 1000 metres
 Clint Robinson
 Qualifying heat: 3:44.768 - 2nd
 Semi final: 3:43.657 - 1st
 Final: 3:29.713 - 3rd 

Men's K-2 500 metres
 Daniel Collins and Andrew Trim
 Qualifying heat: 1:31.433 - 2nd
 Semi final: 1:29.937 - 2nd
 Final: 1:29.409 - 3rd 

Men's K-2 1000 metres
 Peter Scott and Grant Leury
 Qualifying heat: 3:40.114 - 1st
 Semi final: 3:19.056 - 5th
 Final: 3:13.054 - 7th

Men's K-4 1000 metres
 James Walker, Paul Lynch, Brian Morton and Ramon Andersson
 Qualifying heat: 3:11.752 - 3rd
 Semi final: 3:01.806 - 1st
 Final: 2:57.560 - 9th

Women's K-1 500 metres
 Katrin Borchert
 Qualifying heat: 1:53.767 - 1st
 Semi final: 1:51.142 - 5th
 Final: 1:50.811 - 7th

Women's K-2 500 metres
 Anna Wood and Katrin Borchert
 Qualifying heat: 1:43.633 - 2nd
 Semi final: 1:43.729 - 2nd
 Final: 1:40.641 - 3rd 

Women's K-4 500 metres
 Shelley Oates-Wilding, Yanda Nossiter, Lynda Lehmann and Natalie Hunter
 Qualifying heat: 1:41.185 - 3rd
 Semi final: 1:37.905 - 3rd
 Final: 1:34.673 - 8th

Cycling

Road competition
Men's individual time trial
Patrick Jonker
 Final — 1:06:54 (→ 8th place)
Stephen Hodge
 Final — 1:09:59 (→ 23rd place)

Women's individual road race
Kathryn Watt
 Final — 02:37:06 (→ 9th place)
Anna Wilson
 Final — 02:37:06 (→ 17th place)
Tracey Watson
 Final — 02:42:35 (→ 39th place)

Women's individual time trial
Kathryn Watt
 Final — 37:53 (→ 4th place)
Anna Wilson
 Final — 38:50 (→ 10th place)

Track competition
Men's 1,000m time trial
 Shane Kelly — did not finish (→ no ranking)

Men's points race
 Stuart O'Grady
 Final — 25 points (→  Bronze medal)

Mountain bike
Men's cross country
 Cadel Evans
 Final — 2:26:15 (→ 9th place)
 Robert Woods
 Final — 2:33:14 (→ 16th place)

Women's cross country
 Mary Grigson
 Final — 2:02.38 (→ 15th place)

Diving

Men's 3m springboard
Michael Murphy
 Preliminary heat — 419.13
 Semi final — 220.08
 Final — 420.87 (→ 6th place)
Russell Butler
 Preliminary heat — 305.79 (→ did not advance, 28th place)

Women's 3m springboard
Jodie Rogers
 Preliminary heat — 242.19
 Semi final — 204.18 (→ did not advance, 15th place)
Loudy Tourky
 Preliminary heat — 229.11 (→ did not advance, 19th place)

Women's 10m platform
Vyninka Arlow
 Preliminary heat — 243.57 (→ did not advance, 19th place)
Vanessa Baker
 Preliminary heat — 225.84 (→ did not advance, 25th place)

Equestrian

Individual dressage
 Mary Hanna
 Grand Prix Test: 1644 points - 24th
 Grand Prix Special 2nd qualifier: Total score 130.09 - 24th - did not advance

Individual eventing
 Nikki Bishop
 Dressage: 520 points - 3rd
 Cross country: disqualified - eliminated
 David Green
 Dressage: 491 points - 8th
 Cross country: did not finish - retired
 Andrew Hoy
 Dressage: 413+2 points - 29th
 Cross country: total points 49.2 - 14th
 Show jumping: penalty points 0 - 1st
 Final result: 112.60 - 11th

Team eventing
 Wendy Schaeffer, Phillip Dutton, Gillian Rolton and Andrew Hoy
 Dressage: 156.40 - 6th
 Cross country: 27.29 - 1st
 Jumping: 20.25 - 6th
 Final result: 203.85 - 1st 

Individual jumping
 David Cooper
 Total score: 88.25 - 71st
 Russell Johnstone
 Total score: 48.00 - 61st
 Jennifer Parlevliet
 Total score: Did not finish
 Vicki Roycroft
 Total score: 40.00 - 55th

Team jumping
 Jennifer Parlevliet, Vicki Roycroft, David Cooper and Russell Johnstone
 Total score: 129.00 - 19th

Fencing

One woman represented Australia in 1996.

Women's épée
 Sarah Osvath

Football

Men's tournament
 France - Australia 2-0
 Australia - Saudi Arabia 2-1
 Goalscorers: Peter Tsekenis and Mark Viduka
 Spain - Australia 3-2
 Goalscorers: Aurelio Vidmar (2)
 Did not advance from group stage

Squad
 Frank Juric
 Goran Lozanovski
 Ante Moric
 Mark Babic
 Kevin Muscat
 Steve Horvat
 Peter Tsekenis
 Steve Corica
 Mark Viduka
 Aurelio Vidmar
 Danny Tiatto
 Joe Spiteri
 Hayden Foxe
 Paul Agostino
 Luke Casserly
 Robert Enes
 Ross Aloisi
 Michael Petkovic

Gymnastics

Men's competitions
 Brennon Dowrick
 Artistic individual all-around: 35th
 Floor: 83rd
 Horizontal bar: 53rd
 Parallel bars: 56th
 Pommel horse: 45th
 Rings: 69th
 Vault: 92nd
 Bret Hudson
 Artistic individual all-around: Did not advance from preliminary round - 51st
 Floor: 75th
 Horizontal bar: 75th
 Parallel bars: 55th
 Pommel horse: 73rd
 Rings: 78th
 Vault: 55th

Women's competitions
 Joanna Hughes
 Artistic individual all-around: 34th
 Artistic team all-around: 10th
 Balance beam: 62nd
 Floor: 38th
 Uneven bars: 76th
 Vault: 41st
 Nicole Kantek
 Artistic individual all-around: Did not advance from preliminary round - 88th
 Artistic team all-around: 10th
 Balance beam: 93rd
 Floor: 77th
 Uneven bars: 95th
 Vault: 70th
 Kirsty Leigh-Brown
 Artistic individual all-around: Did not advance from preliminary round - 104th
 Ruth Moniz
 Artistic individual all-around: 35th
 Artistic team all-around: 10th
 Balance beam: 30th
 Floor: 80th
 Uneven bars: 40th
 Vault: 84th
 Lisa Moro
 Artistic individual all-around: Did not advance from preliminary round - 77th
 Artistic team all-around: 10th
 Balance beam: 47th
 Floor: 46th
 Uneven bars: 35th
 Vault: 96th
 Lisa Skinner
 Artistic individual all-around: 36th
 Artistic team all-around: 10th
 Balance beam: 42nd
 Floor: 49th
 Uneven bars: 50th
 Vault: 72nd
 Jenny Smith
 Artistic individual all-around: Did not advance from preliminary round - 53rd
 Artistic team all-around: 10th
 Balance beam: 58th
 Floor: 59th
 Uneven bars: 81st
 Vault: 53rd

Hockey

Men's tournament
 Preliminary round (Group B)
 Australia — South Africa 1-1
 Australia — South Korea 3-2
 Australia — The Netherlands 2-3
 Australia — Malaysia 5-1
 Australia — Great Britain 2-0
 Semi finals
 Australia — Spain 1-2
 Bronze medal game
 Australia — Germany 3-2 (→  Bronze medal)
 Team roster
 Mark Hager
 Stephen Davies
 Baeden Choppy
 Lachlan Elmer
 Stuart Carruthers
 Grant Smith
 Damon Diletti (gk)
 Lachlan Dreher (gk)
 Brendan Garard
 Paul Gaudoin
 Paul Lewis
 Matthew Smith
 Jay Stacy
 Daniel Sproule
 Ken Wark
 Michael York
Head coach: Frank Murray

Women's tournament
 Preliminary round robin
 Australia — Spain 4-0
 Australia — Argentina 7-1
 Australia — Germany 1-0
 Australia — South Korea 3-3
 Australia — Great Britain 1-0
 Australia — United States 4-0
 Australia — The Netherlands 4-0
 Final
 Australia — South Korea 3-1 (→  Gold medal)
 Team roster
 Clover Maitland (gk)
 Danni Roche
 Liane Tooth
 Alyson Annan
 Juliet Haslam
 Jenn Morris
 Louise Dobson
 Lisa Powell
 Karen Marsden
 Kate Starre
 Renita Farrell
 Jackie Pereira
 Nova Peris-Kneebone
 Rechelle Hawkes
 Katrina Powell
 Michelle Andrews
Head Coach: Ric Charlesworth

Judo

Modern pentathlon

Men's individual competition:
 Alexander Johnson → 3697 pts, 32nd place

Rowing

Sailing

Shooting

Softball

Women's tournament
Preliminary round robin
Lost to PR China (0:6)
Defeated Chinese Taipei (4:0)
Lost to Puerto Rico (0:2)
Defeated Netherlands (1:0)
Defeated Japan (10:0)
Defeated United States (2:1)
Defeated Canada (5:2)
Semifinals
Defeated Japan (3:0)
Bronze medal match
Lost to PR China (2:4) →  Bronze medal
Team roster
Natalie Ward
Tanya Harding
Peta Edebone
Melanie Roche
Brooke Wilkins
Joanne Brown
Kerry Dienelt
Sally McDermid-McCreedy
Kim Cooper
Carolyn Crudgington
Jennifer Holliday
Joyce Lester
Francine McRae
Haylea Petrie
Nicole Richardson

Swimming

Men's competitions
50m freestyle
 Chris Fydler
 Heat — 22.98 (→ did not advance, 19th place)

100m freestyle
 Chris Fydler
 Heat — 50.72
 B-final — 50.31 (→ 13th place)

200m freestyle
 Daniel Kowalski
 Heat — 1:48.92
 Final — 1:48.25 (→  Bronze medal)
 Michael Klim
 Heat — 1:49.17
 B-final — 1:49.50 (→ 10th place)

200m freestyle
 Daniel Kowalski
 Heat — 3:51.67
 Final — 3:49.39 (→  Bronze medal)
 Malcolm Allen
 Heat — 3:54.34
 B-final — 3:55.48 (→ 13th place)

1500m freestyle
 Kieren Perkins
 Heat — 15:21.42
 Final — 14:56.40 (→  Gold medal)
 Daniel Kowalski
 Heat — 15:12.55
 Final — 15:02.43 (→  Silver medal)

100m backstroke
 Steven Dewick
 Heat — 56.35
 B-Final — 56.82 (→ 15th place)

200m backstroke
 Steven Dewick
 Heat — 2:04.46 (→ did not advance, 23rd place)

100m breaststroke
 Phil Rogers
 Heat — 1:01.80
 Final — 1:01.64 (→ 5th place)

200m breaststroke
 Phil Rogers
 Heat — 2:14.97
 Final — 2:14.79 (→ 5th place)
 Ryan Mitchell
 Heat — 2:15.31
 B-Final — 2:15.63 (→ 11th place)

100m butterfly
 Scott Miller
 Heat — 52.89
 Final — 52.53 (→  Silver medal)
 Michael Klim
 Heat — 53.42
 Final — 53.30 (→ 6th place)

200m butterfly
 Scott Goodman
 Heat — 1:57.77
 Final — 1:57.48 (→  Bronze medal)
 Scott Miller
 Heat — 1:58.97
 Final — 1:58.28 (→ 5th place)

200m individual medley
 Matthew Dunn
 Heat — 2:01.44
 Final — 2:01.57 (→ 5th place)
 Simon Coombs
 Heat — 2:07.31 (→ did not advance, 28th place)

400m individual medley
 Matthew Dunn
 Heat — 4:19.51
 Final — 4:16.66 (→ 4th place)
 Trent Steed
 Heat — 4:24.39
 B-Final — 4:29.35 (→ 15th place)

4 × 100 m freestyle relay
 Michael Klim, Ian Vander-Wal, Scott Logan, and Chris Fydler
 Heat — 3:20.88
 Michael Klim, Matthew Dunn, Scott Logan, and Chris Fydler
 Final — 3:20.13 (→ 6th place)

4 × 200 m freestyle relay
 Kieren Perkins, Glen Housman, Ian Vander-Wal, and Malcolm Allen
 Heat — 7:23.24
 Daniel Kowalski, Michael Klim, Malcolm Allen, and Matthew Dunn
 Final — 7:18.47 (→ 4th place)

4 × 100 m medley relay
 Toby Haenen, Phil Rogers, Scott Miller, and Michael Klim
 Heat — 3:41.30
 Steven Dewick, Phil Rogers, Scott Miller, and Michael Klim
 Final — 3:39.56 (→  Bronze medal)

Women's competitions
50m freestyle
 Karen van Wirdum
 Heat — 25.88
 B-Final — 26.17 (→ 15th place)
 Sarah Ryan
 Heat — 26.34 (→ did not advance, 21st place)

100m freestyle
 Sarah Ryan
 Heat — 56.07
 Final — 55.85 (→ 6th place)

200m freestyle
 Susie O'Neill
 Heat — 2:00.89
 Final — 1:59.87 (→ 5th place)
 Julia Greville
 Heat — 2:00.44
 Final — 2:01.46 (→ 7th place)

400m freestyle
 Emma Johnson
 Heat — 4:14.13
 B-Final — 4:15.79 (→ 12th place)
 Hayley Lewis
 Heat — 4:17.02
 B-Final — 4:16.92 (→ 15th place)

800m freestyle
 Stacey Gartrell
 Heat — 8:42.39 (→ did not advance, 11th place)
 Hayley Lewis
 Heat — 8:45.79 (→ did not advance, 13th place)

100m backstroke
 Nicole Stevenson
 Heat — 1:02.50
 Final — 1:02.70 (→ 7th place)
 Elli Overton
 Heat — 1:03.88
 B-Final — 1:03.69 (→ 14th place)

200m backstroke
 Nicole Stevenson
 Heat — 2:16.71 (→ did not advance, 18th place)

100m breaststroke
 Samantha Riley
 Heat — 1:09.37
 Final — 1:09.18 (→  Bronze medal)
 Helen Denman
 Heat — 1:10.64
 B-Final — 1:10.26 (→ 11th place)

200m breaststroke
 Samantha Riley
 Heat — 2:28.30
 Final — 2:27.91 (→ 4th place)
 Nadine Neumann
 Heat — 2:29.91
 Final — 2:28.34 (→ 6th place)

100m butterfly
 Susie O'Neill
 Heat — 1:00.55
 Final — 1:00.17 (→ 5th place)
 Angela Kennedy
 Heat — 1:01.89 (→ did not advance, 18th place)

200m butterfly
 Susie O'Neill
 Heat — 2:09.46
 Final — 2:07.76 (→  Gold medal)
 Petria Thomas
 Heat — 2:10.64
 Final — 2:09.82 (→  Silver medal)

200m individual medley
 Elli Overton
 Heat — 2:15.81
 Final — 2:16.04 (→ 5th place)
 Emma Johnson
 Heat — 2:17.02
 Final — scratched

400m individual medley
 Emma Johnson
 Heat — 4:43.45
 Final — 4:44.02 (→ 5th place)
 Elli Overton
 Heat — 4:49.82
 B-Final — 4:50.73 (→ 14th place)

4 × 100 m freestyle relay
 Anna Windsor, Sarah Ryan, Lise Mackie, and Julia Greville
 Heat — 3:47.94
 Sarah Ryan, Julia Greville, Lise Mackie, and Susie O'Neill
 Final — 3:45.31 (→ 6th place)

4 × 200 m freestyle relay
 Julia Greville, Lise Mackie, Emma Johnson, and Susie O'Neill
 Heat — 8:09.33
 Julia Greville, Nicole Stevenson, Emma Johnson, and Susie O'Neill
 Final — 8:05.47 (→  Bronze medal)

4 × 100 m medley relay
 Nicole Stevenson, Helen Denman, Angela Kennedy, and Sarah Ryan
 Heat — 4:08.87
 Nicole Stevenson, Samantha Riley, Susie O'Neill, and Sarah Ryan
 Final — 4:05.08 (→  Silver medal)

Table tennis

Tennis

Women's singles tournament
 Rennae Stubbs
 First round — lost to Magdalena Maleeva (Bulgaria) 2-6 1-6
 Rachel McQuillan
 First round — lost to Amanda Coetzer (South Africa) 4-6 6-7

Weightlifting

Men's light-heavyweight (– 83 kg)
Kiril Kounev
 Final — 170.0 + 200.0 = 370.0 (→ 4th place)

Wrestling

See also
Australia at the 1994 Commonwealth Games
Australia at the 1998 Commonwealth Games

References

External links

Nations at the 1996 Summer Olympics
1996
Summer Olympics